Harry Beverley may refer to:
Harry Beverley (rugby league, born 1907) (1907–1982), English rugby league footballer who played in the 1930s and 1940s, and coached in the 1950s and 1960s
Harry Beverley (rugby league, born 1947) (1947–2022), English rugby league footballer who played in the 1970s and 1980s